Delay 1968, or just Delay (as the SACD version is titled), is an archival compilation album by German experimental rock band Can during its work with singer Malcolm Mooney comprising previously unissued early recordings of the band's rejected debut album, Prepared to Meet Thy PNOOM. The song "Thief" had previously been released officially (in a longer edit) on the United Artists compilation album Electric Rock in 1970; it was later covered live by Radiohead.

Holger Czukay has said that Delay 1968 was originally intended to be the band's first album, Prepared to Meet Thy PNOOM ("Pnoom" being the name of the album's second track—a 27-second saxophone instrumental, recorded as part of their Ethnological Forgery Series). When no record company would release the record, Can set out to make a somewhat more accessible album, which became their 1969 debut Monster Movie. Parts of Delay 1968 circulated in bootleg form for several years under the title Unopened, and included other tracks recorded during the same sessions that would later surface in various forms on other albums.

Track listing

Personnel
Holger Czukay – bass
Michael Karoli – guitar
Jaki Liebezeit – drums, percussion, saxophone
Irmin Schmidt – keyboards
Malcolm Mooney – vocals

References

Can (band) albums
1981 compilation albums